A list of horror films released in 2013.

References

External links
 MovieUncover2.com - List of Horror Film

Lists of horror films by year
2013-related lists